The Capture of Bigfoot (a.k.a. The Legend of Bigfoot) is a 1979 horror film from Bill Rebane, the director of Monster A-Go-Go. Produced and originally released by Studio Film Corp, the film was re-released in 2010 by Troma Entertainment.

Plot

The creature known as Bigfoot has managed to elude capture for more than 25 years and a small town has made a cottage industry out of local Bigfoot sightings and merchandising.  When a businessman decides to trap Bigfoot once and for all so that he can benefit, the town may ultimately lose the tourist profits that have filled the town's coffers.

Cast

 Janus Raudkivi as The Legendary Creature of Arak
 Randolph Rebane as Little Bigfoot
 Otis Young as Jason
 George 'Buck' Flower as Jake
 William Dexter as Hank
 Jeana Keough as Dancer
 Stafford Morgan as Garrett
 Katherine Hopkins as Karen
 Richard Kennedy as Olsen
 John F. Goff as Burt
 John Eimerman as Jimmy
 Randolph Scott as Randy
 Wally Flaherty as Sheriff Cooper
 Durwood McDonald as John
 Harry Youstos as Harry
 Verkina Flower as Linda
 Greg Gault as Kevin
 Nelson C. Sheppo as Daniels
 Mitzi Kress as Elsie
 Woody Jarvis as Woody
 William D. Cannon as Carlsen

Reception

In his book All I Need to Know about Filmmaking I Learned from the Toxic Avenger, Troma president Lloyd Kaufman lists this film as one of the five worst Troma films ever distributed (along with Croaked: Frog Monster from Hell, also directed by Bill Rebane). Shot in Gleason, Wisconsin, the film's closing credits attribute the "wardrobe" to Kmart.

References

External links 
 
 The Capture of Bigfoot at Rotten Tomatoes
 

1979 films
American independent films
Troma Entertainment films
1979 horror films
Bigfoot films
Films directed by Bill Rebane
1970s English-language films
1970s American films